Srinivasan "Srini" Seshan is an American computer scientist and a professor of computer science at Carnegie Mellon University, specializing in computer networks.

Education and career
Seshan's bachelor's degree, master's degree, and Ph.D. are all from the University of California, Berkeley, in 1990, 1993, and 1995. His thesis, Low Latency Handoff in Mobile Networks, was supervised by Randy Katz. After graduating, he joined the Thomas J. Watson Research Center where he was a research staff member until 2000, when he joined the CMU faculty. At CMU, he was Finmeccanica Associate Professor from 2004 to 2006. He is currently a Full Professor and was the Associate Department Head at the Computer Science Department at CMU from 2011 to 2015. It was announced in March, 2018 that Frank Pfenning would be stepping down as department head and Seshan would be taking over, effective July 1, 2018.

Recognition
He was elected as an ACM Fellow in 2019 "for contributions to computer networking, mobile computing and wireless communications".

References

External links
Google scholar profile

Living people
20th-century births
American computer scientists
Carnegie Mellon University faculty
University of California, Berkeley alumni
Year of birth missing (living people)
Fellows of the Association for Computing Machinery